SS Buresk was a 4,337-ton steamship built by Richardson, Duck and Company, Thornaby-on-Tees for Burdick and Cook, London in 1914.

During World War I, Buresk was captured by the Imperial German Navy light cruiser  while on her way to Hong Kong with a cargo of coal in 1914. Emden′s crew retained her as a  prize and used her as a prison ship and collier. Under the command of Lieutenant Commander R. Klöpper, she coaled Emden near the Nicobar Islands on 26 October 1914.

On 9 November 1914, the Royal Australian Navy light cruiser  defeated Emden forcing her to run aground in the Cocos (Keeling) Islands in the Battle of Cocos. Unaware of this, Buresk approached the islands to coal Emden again, then attempted to flee when she sighted Sydney. Sydney chased her down, and her crew was in the process of scuttling her when a Sydney boarding party came aboard. The boarding party found that her inlet valves had been opened and irreparably damaged. Sydney then sank her with gunfire.

Notes

1914 ships
Ships built on the River Tees
Maritime incidents in November 1914
World War I shipwrecks in the Indian Ocean
Shipwrecks of the Cocos (Keeling) Islands